Tony McNamara (born 1967) is an Australian playwright, screenwriter, and television producer. He is also an occasional film director and producer.

Early life
McNamara was born in Kilmore, Australia, and was educated at Assumption College, Kilmore. Following careers in catering and finance, McNamara settled on a career as a writer following a visit to Rome. His education consisted of studying writing at the Royal Melbourne Institute of Technology and screenwriting at the Australian Film, Television and Radio School.

Career
After writing various television episodes and stage plays, McNamara made his film debut in 2003 directing The Rage in Placid Lake, adapted from his stage play The Café Latte Kid.

Following this, McNamara wrote for various television programmes in Australia, most notably The Secret Life of Us, Love My Way, Tangle and Puberty Blues. In 2015, McNamara directed his second feature film, comedy-drama Ashby starring Mickey Rourke, Sarah Silverman and Emma Roberts.

A year later, McNamara returned to television as creator of medical drama Doctor Doctor.

In 2018, McNamara received critical acclaim for his work in co-writing the historical comedy-drama film The Favourite.

McNamara created The Great, a series revolving around the life of Catherine the Great, starring Elle Fanning and Nicholas Hoult which premiered on Hulu on May 15, 2020. It is based upon his play about Catherine the Great, which premiered at the Sydney Theater Company in 2008. McNamara also wrote a film adaptation of the play, "It had been a play and a film, and I was always struggling [with] the fact it was such a massive story for a film. I wanted to tell it as a story that goes for years and years."

Filmography

Film

Television 
{|class="wikitable"
! Year
! Title
! Notes
! Ref
|-
| 1993
| All Together Now
| 1 episode; 'Your Cheatin' Heart
|rowspan=13| 
|-
| 1997
| Big Sky
| 3 episodes
|-
| 2001-2005
| The Secret Life of Us
| 12 episodes
|-
| 2004-2007
| Love My Way
| 7 episodes
|-
|rowspan=3| 2008
| Echo Beach
| 2 episodes
|-
| Moving Wallpaper| rowspan="2" | 1 episode
|-
| Rush|-
| 2009-2012
| Tangle| 7 episodes
|-
| 2010-2011
| Spirited| 3 episodes
|-
| 2011
| Offspring| 1 episode; 'Complications'
|-
| 2012-2014
| Puberty Blues| 7 episodes
|-
| 2016-2018
| Doctor Doctor| Creator, 15 episodes
|-
| 2020-2021
| The Great| Creator, 17 episodes
|}

Personal life
McNamara is married to Australian actress Belinda Bromilow, who appears as Aunt Elizabeth in The Great''.

Accolades

References

External links
 

1967 births
Living people
Australian film directors
Australian film producers
Australian screenwriters
Australian television producers
Australian television writers
Best Original Screenplay BAFTA Award winners
Best Screenplay AACTA International Award winners
Australian male television writers